In Bed With My Doona is the second album by Australian comedian/musician The Bedroom Philosopher and is a reference to the Madonna film Madonna: Truth or Dare which was known in some countries as In Bed with Madonna. It was released on Nan and Pop Records in 2005 (see 2005 in music). The release was taken strongly by Triple J's audience, with the first single "I'm So Postmodern" reaching number 72 in the Hottest 100. Follow-up singles included "Folkstar" and "Golden Gaytime", a song about the ice cream bar of the same name.

The first 100 copies contain Track 16, "Special Features", which is a live track recorded at Mic in Hand comedy night, Friend in Hand Hotel, Sydney September 2004.

An additional 100 copies featured a special ‘coloured barcode’ but no live track, and were produced for the regional tour of Western Australia supporting Australian folk comedy trio Tripod.

Track listing
 Love Theme From Centrelink
 Golden Gaytime
 Megan The Vegan
 I'm So Postmodern
 McRock
 Megan The Vegan (reprise)
 Folkstar
 High On Life
 Kicking The Footy With God
 You’re So Vague
 Saving Myself For Marriage
 Everybody’s Got The Same Insecurities As You
 Happy Cow
 The Heart Song
 Folkstar Part II

Personnel

Musicians
 Justin Heazlewood - Vocals and Guitar.

Technical
 Produced, recorded and mixed by Ken Heazlewood.

References

2005 albums
The Bedroom Philosopher albums
Musical tributes to Madonna